The Great Wall Voleex C50 is a compact car manufactured by the Chinese company Great Wall Motors from 2012 to 2016.

Overview

The Voleex C50 was launched at the 2011 Guangzhou International Motor Show. The styling of the side profile of the Great Wall Voleex C50 heavily resembles an Eighth generation Honda Civic sedan.

Features
The car is powered by a 1.5-litre turbocharged petrol engine, delivering up to 
It is the first turbocharged model of the Chinese manufacturer. It complies with the Euro IV emission standards.

It comes with standard front airbags, ABS, EBD, ESP, trip computer, and optionally can be equipped with electric sunroof, leather seats, side and curtain airbags, cruise control or rear parking sensors.

Safety
In December 2012, it was awarded five stars by China-NCAP, the Chinese New Car Assessment Program, in a session that used newer, revised standards. It scored a total of 52.5 points. This result included: 14.68 points in the frontal 100% crash test, 14.54 points in the frontal offset 40% crash test, 17.37 points in the side crash test, 2.73 points in the seat whiplash test, and 3 bonus points.

References

External links
Official website

C-NCAP small family cars
Voleex C50
Cars introduced in 2011
2010s cars
Cars of China